Nothing's Gonna Hold Us Down is the third EP by the Seattle powerpop band Danger Radio. It was released on October 5, 2010.

Track listing
 "Nothing's Gonna Hold Us Down" - 3:31
 "You & Me" - 3:08
 "Memories" - 4:17
 "Build It Up" - 2:55
 "Set You Free" - 3:57
 "Alibis" - 3:21
 "So Shaken Up" - 3:03

References

External links
 Nothing's Gonna Hold Us Down by Danger Radio

2010 EPs
Danger Radio albums